Cooper NO en Andere v Die Meester en 'n Ander, an important case in South African property law, was heard in the Appellate Division on 7 November 1991, with judgment handed down on 5 March 1992.

Judgment 
The Insolvency Act contains an exhaustive list of priorities of statutory preferences on insolvency. The court found that a special notarial bond over specified movable property, when that property has remained in the possession of the mortgagor until the sequestration of his estate, is not included in this list and accordingly does not confer a statutory preference in favour of the mortgagee. It follows, held the court, that the mortgagee has no preference above other concurrent creditors in respect of the free residue.

The decision in the Orange Free State Provincial Division, in Cooper NO en Andere v Die Meester en 'n Ander, was thus reversed.

See also 
 South African property law

References

Cases 
 Cooper NO en Andere v Die Meester en 'n Ander 1991 (3) SA 158.
 Cooper NO en Andere v Die Meester en 'n Ander 1992 (3) SA 60 (A).

Statutes 
 Insolvency Act 24 of 1936.
 Prevention of Illegal Eviction from and Unlawful Occupation of Land Act 19 of 1998.

Notes 

1992 in South African law
1992 in case law
South African property case law
Appellate Division (South Africa) cases